Mark Stennett, professionally known as DJ Mark Da Spot, is an American record producer and DJ.

Early life 
Stennett was born in Montego, Jamaica and grew up in Bronx, New York.

Career 
Stennett began his career performing in clubs, including China Club, Sweet Sixteen, and Lotus, where he met Justin Timberlake, who offered to hire him as his DJ. He is the founder of Top Floor Entertainment, an events coordinator/promoter company that is composed of other DJs.

In 2020, Stennett became the West Coast Brand Ambassador for 50 Cent's Branson Cognac and Le Chemin du Roi Champagne.

Discography

Singles 
 2022: The Motions
 2022: Gold Rush

Recognition 
In 2014, Stennett was awarded the Global Spin Award for Regional Club DJ of the year. In 2014 and 2015, he received Salute the DJs Award. 

He has received the Best West Coast DJ of The Year Award 3 times consecutively by the Global Spin Award.

References

External links 
 Official website

Living people
20th-century American musicians
21st-century American musicians
African-American businesspeople
African-American record producers
American hip hop DJs
African-American DJs